Wycheproof  is a small town in the centre of the Shire of Buloke, in north western Victoria, Australia.

History
The economy of Wycheproof is driven mainly by wheat.

The railway from Bendigo and Korong Vale reached the area in 1883 and was later extended north. The township was established beside the railway and the Post Office opened on 1 April 1884 replacing earlier offices from 1876 serving the rural area named Wycheproof (renamed to Moffat) and Mount Wycheproof. The last regular passenger service though the local railway station was from Bendigo to Sea Lake on 7 May 1977 and was operated by a Diesel Electric railmotor. The town is unusual in that even today the railway line runs along the centre of the main street.

The Wycheproof Magistrates' Court, based in the historic Wycheproof Court House, closed on 1 January 1983.

In an attempt to attract new residents, the local community developed a project to offer otherwise vacant farmhouses for rent at A$1 per week. Expressions of interest in the scheme have been heard from Brazil, Argentina, Spain, Austria, Switzerland, Germany, and Ireland as well as most parts of Australia. The project was inspired by a similar program at Cumnock, New South Wales.

Sport
Wycheproof has a proud sporting history. With its neighbouring township Narraport, Wycheproof has an Australian rules football team (Wycheproof-Narraport) competing in the North Central Football League. AFL players from Wycheproof include Corey Jones, Mervyn Keane, Greg Kennedy and Chris Pym.

Wycheproof has a horse racing club, the Mt Wycheproof & District Racing Club, whose one meeting a year is the Mount Wycheproof Cup meeting held on Victoria Derby day in late October or early November.

Golfers play at the course of the Wycheproof Golf Club on the Calder Highway.

Notable people
 Wycheproof is the birthplace of Peta Credlin, who was Chief of Staff for Tony Abbott, former Prime Minister and former leader of the Liberal Party of Australia.  
 VFL footballer Greg Kennedy is from the Wycheproof district and recruited by Carlton from Eaglehawk Football Club/Wycheproof.

Gallery

References

External links
Photos of trains at Wycheproof, by various photographers
Local history
Farm rental scheme

Towns in Victoria (Australia)
Street running
Shire of Buloke